Parliamentary elections were held in Latvia on 1 October 2022, following the end of the term of the 13th Saeima elected in 2018.

Electoral system
The 100 members of the Saeima are elected by open list, proportional representation from five multi-member constituencies ranging in size from 12 to 36 seats and based on the regions of Latvia, with overseas votes included in the Riga constituency. Seats are allocated using the Sainte-Laguë method with a national electoral threshold of 5%. Voters may cast "specific votes" for candidates on the list that they have voted for. This involves drawing a plus sign (+) next to the candidate's names to indicate preference (positive votes), or by crossing out names to indicate dissaproval (negative votes). The number of votes for each candidate is the number of votes cast for the list, plus their number of positive votes, minus their number of negative votes. The candidates with the highest vote totals fill their party's seats.

Seat redistribution 
The Central Electoral Commission is required to determine the number of Members of Parliament (MPs) to be elected using the number of eligible voters four months before the election. On 2 June 2022, the Central Electoral Commission has announced the new distribution of MPs. Rīga and Vidzeme constituencies have both gained one seat compared to the 2018 election, while Latgale and Zemgale constituencies have both lost one.

Parties

Lead candidates 
Latvia First became the first major party to announce Ainārs Šlesers as its candidate for the position of Prime Minister on 14 August, during the founding congress of the party.

Each of the member parties of the Union of Greens and Farmers proposed their own PM candidate to the party alliance board, and then they would decide on the one candidate for the whole party alliance. The Latvian Farmers' Union nominated MP Viktors Valainis as their candidate, while the Green Party kept its candidate secret. In the end, the Greens left the Union and joined the United List alliance.

Overview 
The table below lists parties and party alliances currently represented in the 13th Saeima.

Competing parties 
Political parties and party alliances are able to submit their electoral lists to the Central Electoral Commission from 13 July until 2 August. So far, four lists have been submitted to and registered by the CEC.

In the table below, the number in each box indicates the number of candidates standing on the party's electoral list in the indicated constituency. The maximum number of candidates on the electoral list in each constituency equals the number of MPs to be elected plus three.

Members of the Saeima not standing for re-election

Opinion polls

Results 
The New Unity party of incumbent prime minister Krišjānis Kariņš received the highest percentage of the vote (19%) and won the most seats (26). In a speech after the election, Kariņš stated that Latvia would continue to support Ukraine against Russia and he stated his preference to maintain the current coalition government. The Union of Greens and Farmers placed second, receiving 13% of the vote, despite leader Aivars Lembergs being sentenced to five years in prison in 2021 and under sanction by the United States. The other parties which placed above the 5% threshold to receive a seat in parliament were the United List with 11%, the National Alliance with 9.3%, For Stability! with 7%, Latvia First with 6%, and The Progressives, who entered parliament for the first time with 6% of the vote.

The unrepresented vote in this election was 29.09%. Harmony, who had placed first in the previous three general elections, was unable to secure any parliamentary seats, being slightly under the 5% threshold (of all votes, including invalid) with 4.9% of the vote. This has been attributed by many reasons, including internal disputes on the 2022 Russian invasion of Ukraine, pushing away both ethnic Latvians and ethnic Russians. This resulted in much of the ethnic Russian population voting for Stability!, Sovereign Power, and the Latvian Russian Union. The Development/For! alliance, one of the coalition members, also narrowly missed out the 5% threshold by just 0.03% (with 4.97% of all votes). Another coalition member, the Conservatives, also failed to cross the 5% threshold, receiving 3% of the vote.

By constituency

Seat distribution

Aftermath
On 3 October 2022 President Egils Levits authorized Kariņš, the incumbent Prime Minister and leader of New Unity, to form a coalition government. The following day, the Union of Greens and Farmers announced in an interview that they would refuse to be part of a coalition with Kariņš. As of 9 October 2022 the possible coalition consists of the Unity List and the National Alliance. Kariņš is also negotiating with the Progressives, though the other coalition parties are opposed to this, instead preferring a "compact, ideologically monolithic and effective coalition".

References

Latvia
Parliamentary election
Latvia
Parliamentary elections in Latvia